Formicola (Campanian:  or ) is a comune (municipality) in the Province of Caserta in Campania, Italy. It borders the municipalities of Camigliano, Giano Vetusto, Pietramelara, Pontelatone, Roccaromana, and Rocchetta e Croce.

References

Cities and towns in Campania